Rajatantra is a 2021 Indian Kannada-language film directed by PVR Swamy in his directorial debut. The film stars Raghavendra Rajkumar. P.V.R. Swamy previously worked as a cinematographer for Raghavendra Rajkumar's Ammana Mane (2019). The film was the first release of 2021.

Cast 

Raghavendra Rajkumar as Captain Rajaram
Bhavya
Doddanna as the home minister
Srinivasa Murthy as the chief minister
Shankar Ashwath
 Neenasam Ashwath
 Muni
 Ranjan Hassan
 B. Shivananda
 Prathap Simha
 Herambha
 Praveen
 Vallabh Suri
 Venkatesh Prasad
 H. Vijayabhaskar

The flashback scene from Dr. Rajkumar's Parashuram (1989) is used in the film.

Production 
Raghavendra Rajkumar was cast as an army veteran. The film was shot in Bengaluru, Madikeri, Mysuru, and Nelamangala. Rajatantra was entirely made during the COVID-19 pandemic.

Reception 
A. Sharadaa of The New Indian Express opined that "Raghavendra Rajkumar, in his role as a retired military officer, lifts up this jumbled drama that deals with immorality in society". Sunayana Suresh of The Times of India called the film an "amateurish attempt". Vijaya Karnataka praised the performance of the cast.

References

External links